Martin Low FRS (27 July 1950 – 6 August 2013) was a molecular cell biologist who discovered GPI (glycosylphosphatidylinositol) membrane anchors in eukaryotic cells.

He was elected Fellow of the Royal Society in 1996.

References 

1950 births
2013 deaths
Molecular biology
Fellows of the Royal Society